Melisa Abimbola, better known as Melisa Whiskey is a British-Nigerian Afropop singer and songwriter. She is mostly known for her songs Billin, Ajeh, Thredhold etc.

Career 
Whiskey was born in Hackney and raised in Bray Towers Camden, London. She had been introduced to Gospel & soul music at a young age through her father, a music enthusiast and historian who had been born in Leeds. Melisa signed her first publishing deal with BMG in 2015. During her time at Leicester University, Melisa performed open mic nights and gradually gathered support from BBC Music Introducing. When she released her first track “Played” in 2016, she received recognition from BBC Radio 1Xtra’s Twin B and subsequently playlisted on BBC Radio 1Xtra. Melisa's collaboration with Redlight, Thredhold entered the BBC Radio 1 Dance Chart and reached spot 39. In the same year she collaborated in the song Searching with Harry Romero and Roger Sanchez on the Strictly Rhythmn label. By March 2017 she released her song Sweetest Cake. She also collaborated in the song Maybe Now with STéLOUSE. Later in 2017 Melisa released an extended play record called The Moon + The Sky. Billin, the song with a mixture of pop and hip hop, was one of the most popular tracks out of this EP and was playlisted on BBC Radio London. In 2019, Whiskey teamed with Mystro, to introduce her single Ajeh as well as Bonjour which was produced by E- Kelly. In December 2019, Whiskey performed at O2 Forum Kentish Town with Afro beats Artist Mr Eazi.

Discography

Singles 

 Threshold (With Redlight) - 2015
 Played - 2016 
 Maybe Now (with STéLOUSE) - 2016 
 Sweetest Cake - 2017
 Cuffin or Cuttin'''  - 2017
 Billin - 2017
 Bonjour - 2018 
 Ajeh - 2019 
 Crazy Love - 2020

 EP 

 Moon + The Sky -'' 2017

Chart

References 

21st-century English musicians
British women pop singers
Year of birth missing (living people)
Living people